Wierzbowo may refer to the following places:
Wierzbowo, Kuyavian-Pomeranian Voivodeship (north-central Poland)
Wierzbowo, Grajewo County in Podlaskie Voivodeship (north-east Poland)
Wierzbowo, Łomża County in Podlaskie Voivodeship (north-east Poland)
Wierzbowo, Masovian Voivodeship (east-central Poland)
Wierzbowo, Działdowo County in Warmian-Masurian Voivodeship (north Poland)
Wierzbowo, Ełk County in Warmian-Masurian Voivodeship (north Poland)
Wierzbowo, Mrągowo County in Warmian-Masurian Voivodeship (north Poland)
Wierzbowo, Nidzica County in Warmian-Masurian Voivodeship (north Poland)